The 1973–74 Midland Football Combination season was the 37th in the history of Midland Football Combination, a football competition in England.

Division One

Division One featured 17 clubs which competed in the division last season, no new clubs joined the division this season.

League table

References

1973–74
M